The 1949 Hazara Rebellion was a rebellion by Hazara rebels in the region of Shahristan in the Kingdom of Afghanistan, which took place in 1949. It was suppressed by a military battalion led by the governor of Kabul, after which the leader of the rebellion, Qurban Zawar, was arrested. He was ordered to be executed under the direct commands of Mohammed Zahir Shah.

References 

1949 in Afghanistan
Conflicts in 1949
Military history of Afghanistan
Rebellions in Afghanistan
Hazarajat